Ryomei Tanaka (田中亮明, Tanaka Ryōmei, born 13 October 1993) is a Japanese boxer. He won bronze medals flyweight division in the men's flyweight event at the 2020 Summer Olympics. His younger brother, Kosei is a former WBO triple world champion.

References

External links
 

1993 births
Living people
Japanese male boxers
Komazawa University alumni
Olympic boxers of Japan
Boxers at the 2020 Summer Olympics
Olympic medalists in boxing
Olympic bronze medalists for Japan
Medalists at the 2020 Summer Olympics
Place of birth missing (living people)
Asian Games competitors for Japan
Boxers at the 2018 Asian Games